Breathe is the ninth studio album by Australian rock band, Midnight Oil, which was released on 15 October 1996 under the Columbia Records label. It peaked at No. 3 on the ARIA Albums Chart and appeared in the top 40 on the New Zealand and Swiss Albums Charts. The album was produced by Malcolm Burn and according to Australian musicologist, Ian McFarlane, it had a loose, raw style with almost a low-key sound.

Background
Australian rock band, Midnight Oil, released their ninth studio album, Breathe, on 15 October 1996, which appeared three-and-a-half years after their eighth album, Earth and Sun and Moon. The line-up for the album was Peter Garrett on lead vocals, Bones Hillman on bass guitar and vocals, Rob Hirst on drums and vocals, Jim Moginie on guitars, keyboards, and vocals, and Martin Rotsey on guitars. The album was produced by Malcolm Burn and released for Sprint Music by Columbia Records.

Reception

Breathe peaked at No. 3 on the ARIA Albums Chart and appeared in the top 40 on the New Zealand and Swiss Albums Charts. In Australia it was certified gold for shipment of 35,000 copies by ARIA. AllMusic's reviewer, Stephen Thomas Erlewine, described it as having "a more direct sound while keeping the anthemic melodicism ... less ambitious than its predecessor, yet also more forceful". According to Australian musicologist, Ian McFarlane, it had a loose, raw style with almost a low-key sound. Rolling Stones Tom Moon compared it to earlier albums which "were filled with wide-screen screeds, the lectures on Breathe are offset by evocative mood pieces ... In fusing the hurtling momentum of punk with the righteousness of old-timey hymns, the Oils have arrived at a potent music that uplifts as it agitates".

Track listing

Personnel

Midnight Oil
 Peter Garrett – lead vocals
 Bones Hillman – bass, vocals
 Rob Hirst – drums, vocals
 Jim Moginie – guitars, keyboards, vocals
 Martin Rotsey – guitars

Guest musicians
 Malcolm Burn – guitars, organ, bass
 Emmylou Harris – vocals
 Buddy Miller – guitars
 Daryl Johnson – Djembe
 Ethan Allan – piano

Charts

Certifications

References

External links
 Midnight Oil

1996 albums
Sprint Music albums
Midnight Oil albums
Albums produced by Malcolm Burn